Przybkowo may refer to the following places in West Pomeranian Voivodeship, Poland:

Kolonia Przybkowo 
Przybkowo, Szczecinek County
Przybkowo, Wałcz County